"Pas le temps" is the name of a 2006 song recorded by French rapper Faf Larage. It was released as a single in September 2006 and featured as theme for credits of the American action/serial drama television series Prison Break. The B-side is "C'est pas ma faute", a song that was released as a single in October 2007. "Pas le temps" achieved a huge success in France and Belgium (Wallonia), topping the charts for two months, even becoming the best-selling single of 2006 in France and as of August 2014, it was the 45th best-selling single of the 21st century in France, with 413,000 units sold. It remains Larage's first big hit and his signature song.

Track listings

 CD single
 "Pas le temps" (radio edit) — 3:38
 "Pas le temps" (Instrumental) — 3:47
 "C'est pas ma faute" — 4:03

 Digital download
 "Pas le temps" (radio edit) — 3:38

Charts

Certifications and sales

References

2006 singles
Faf Larage songs
Ultratop 50 Singles (Wallonia) number-one singles
SNEP Top Singles number-one singles
Television drama theme songs